The 1983–84 IHL season was the 39th season of the International Hockey League, a North American minor professional league. Seven teams participated in the regular season, and the Flint Generals won the Turner Cup.

Regular season

Turner Cup-Playoffs

External links
 Season 1983/84 on hockeydb.com

IHL
International Hockey League (1945–2001) seasons